120 may refer to:

120 (number), the number
AD 120, a year in the 2nd century AD
120 BC, a year in the 2nd century BC
120 film, a film format for still photography
120 (film), a 2008 film
120 (MBTA bus)
120 (New Jersey bus)
120 (Kent) Construction Regiment, Royal Engineers
 120 volts, standard electrical mains voltage in several countries in the Americas
Lenovo IdeaPad 120, a discontinued brand of notebook computers
Ching Chung stop (MTR digital station code 120), a Light Rail stop in Tuen Mun, Hong Kong

1/20 may refer to:

 January 20 (month-day date notation)

See also

 Unbinilium, a hypothetical chemical element with atomic number 120
 CXX (disambiguation)